Chen Tao (born 11 March 1985) is a retired Chinese footballer. He is the currently assistant coach for Chinese Super League club Shenzhen.

Club career

Changsha Ginde
Chen Tao started his football career with Shenyang Ginde in the 2003 season  where he made an immediate impact by playing in eighteen league games and scoring one goal. He would continue to establish himself as an important member of the squad throughout the following seasons and would further cement his position within the team by playing as captain throughout the 2004 season. Though he often lead Shenyang Ginde to mid-table or lowly positions within the league he would be a loyal member of the team even when they decided to move to Changsha and changed their name to Changsha Ginde, however during the start of the 2008 season he was involved in a bitter transfer dispute with his club. He made an announcement that if he failed to secure a transfer to FC Luch-Energiya, then he would retire from football and the Chinese national team. FC Luch-Energiya announced that they had agreed a price with Changsha Ginde and agreed personal terms with the player, but the transfer papers from Changsha failed to materialize, therefore the transfer has fallen through.

Shanghai Shenhua
After an entire season where Chen was unable to secure a move yet still contractually obliged to Changsha Ginde, he was finally released by the club at the beginning of the 2009 season where he moved to Shanghai Shenhua. He made his competitive debut for Shenhua on his 24th birthday, in their first Asian Champions League group stage match against Singapore Armed Forces, where they won 4-1. He would quickly go on to establish himself an integral member of the team and go on to score his first goal for the club on 3 April 2009 in a league game against Shandong Luneng that Shenhua won 4-1. Shenhua were expected to be title contenders that season, however they finished in a disappointing fifth. This saw the club bring in experienced manager Miroslav Blažević into the team the following season and he decided to place Jiang Kun in midfield instead.

Tianjin Teda
After being dropped by Shanghai Shenhua, Chen was given a chance to go on loan to top tier side Tianjin Teda during the 2010 season and would immediately make an impact towards the team when on his league debut on 27 July 2010 he would also score his first goal for the club against Henan Construction in a 2-1 victory. He would go on to be a vital member of the team and quickly saw Tianjin become runners-up within the league. After his successful stint with the club, Chen would make his move permanent and would transfer to Tianjin Teda permanently on 14 February 2011.

Dalian Aerbin
On 21 December 2012, Chen left Tianjin Teda and transferred to Dalian Aerbin. He made his debut for Dalian on 9 March 2013 in a 1-0 loss to Shandong Luneng.

Sichuan Longfor
On 23 June 2016, Chen signed for China League Two side Sichuan Longfor.

Retirement
On 29 May 2020, Chen Tao announced his retirement from professional football.

International career
Chen would play for the Chinese under-20 national team that took part in the 2005 FIFA World Youth Championship and would play in four games in a tournament that saw China knocked out in the last sixteen. This would see him promoted to the senior team and called up for the squad that took part in the 2005 East Asian Football Championship where he made his debut on 31 July 2005 against South Korea in a 1-1 draw. China would win the tournament and under the team's manager Zhu Guanghu, Chen would start to become a regular within the side, however still being under twenty years old the Chinese under-20 national team manager Liu Chunming would make him the captain for the team that took part in the 2007 Toulon Tournament in France and would make history by taking China to the finals for the first time, where they eventually lost to the hosts France. He was awarded the Souvenir Jean-Philippe Rethacker, which roughly means the most graceful player of the tournament. He also scored one of the best goals of the tournament, a match-winning free kick against Ghana. With the 2008 Summer Olympics looming, Chen was expected to captain the Chinese under-23 national team, however due to the lack of competitive playing time due to his off-field problems he had with his club, he only played in two games, both as a substitute.

Career statistics

International goals

Honours

Club
Tianjin Teda
Chinese FA Cup: 2011

International
China PR national football team
 East Asian Football Championship: 2005

Individual
 Chinese Football Association Young Player of the Year: 2004

References

External links 
 Player profile - sports.sina.com.cn
 Player profile - football-lineups.com
 
 
 Player profile - Sport star wiki
 Player profile - sohu.com

1985 births
Living people
Sportspeople from Anshan
Chinese footballers
Footballers from Liaoning
China international footballers
Footballers at the 2008 Summer Olympics
Olympic footballers of China
Changsha Ginde players
Shanghai Shenhua F.C. players
Tianjin Jinmen Tiger F.C. players
Dalian Professional F.C. players
Sichuan Longfor F.C. players
Chinese Super League players
China League One players
Footballers at the 2006 Asian Games
Association football midfielders
Asian Games competitors for China